Valderredible is a municipality in Cantabria, Spain.

References

External links
Official website 

Municipalities in Cantabria